Cappagh is a townland in County Westmeath, Ireland.

Cappagh is one of 9 townlands of the civil parish of Russagh in the barony of Moygoish in the Province of Leinster. Cappagh contained a small lake Lough Garr and Crane Island. The area is now drained.

The neighbouring townlands are: Culvin to the north, Garriskil to the north–east, Ballyharney to the east, Grange to the south–east, Carrick and Ballinalack to the south, Joanstown to the south–west and
Corrydonnellan and Barratogher to the north–west.

In the 1911 census of Ireland there were 11 houses and 60 inhabitants in the townland.

References

External links
Map of Cappagh at openstreetmap.org
Cappagh at the IreAtlas Townland Data Base
Cappagh at Townlands.ie
Cappagh at The Placenames Database of Ireland

Townlands of County Westmeath